The 1940 Wofford Terriers football team represented Wofford College as a member of the Southern Intercollegiate Athletic Association (SIAA) during the 1940 college football season. Led by seventh-year head coach Jules Carson, the Terriers compiled an overall record of 3–4–2 with a mark of 2–2–1 in conference play, tying for 17th place in the SIAA.

Schedule

References

Wofford
Wofford Terriers football seasons
Wofford Terriers football